The 2019 Troy Trojans football team represented Troy University in the 2019 NCAA Division I FBS football season. The Trojans played their home games at Veterans Memorial Stadium in Troy, Alabama, and competed in the East Division of the Sun Belt Conference. They were led by first-year head coach Chip Lindsey.

Previous season
The Trojans finished the 2018 season 10–3, 7–1 in Sun Belt play to finish in a tie for the East Division championship with Appalachian State. Due to their head-to-head loss to Appalachian State, the  Trojans did not represent the East Division in the Sun Belt Championship Game. They received an invitation to the Dollar General Bowl where they defeated Buffalo.

Head coach Neal Brown left at the conclusion of the season to become the head coach at West Virginia. On January 10, 2019, the school hired Kansas coordinator Chip Lindsey as head coach.

Preseason

Sun Belt coaches poll

Preseason All-Sun Belt Teams

Schedule

Game summaries

Campbell

Southern Miss

at Akron

Arkansas State

at Missouri

South Alabama

at Georgia State

at Coastal Carolina

Georgia Southern

at Texas State

at Louisiana

Appalachian State

References

Troy
Troy Trojans football seasons
Troy Trojans football